Petar Kurdov (Bulgarian: Петър Курдов; born 13 March 1961) is a Bulgarian football player and manager. His son is the football player Atanas Kurdov.

Career
He played for Bulgarian team of Levski Sofia and during that time he made his debut with the national team while also having his best seasons. After that he was part of two experiences abroad at Mainz 05 and Mallorca.

Titles
Levski Sofia
Bulgarian Championship: (3) 1983-1984, 1984-1985, 1987-88
Bulgarian Cup: (2) 1981-82, 1983-84
Cup of the Soviet Army: (2) 1983-84, 1987-88

International career
He made his debut at national team in 1981.

References

External links 
 Profile at LevskiSofia.info

1961 births
Living people
Bulgarian footballers
Bulgaria international footballers
FC Maritsa Plovdiv players
Botev Plovdiv players
PFC Levski Sofia players
RCD Mallorca players
FC Lokomotiv 1929 Sofia players
PFC Slavia Sofia players
First Professional Football League (Bulgaria) players
Bulgarian expatriate footballers
Bulgarian football managers
PFC Spartak Varna managers
Association football forwards